Zered Bassett (born February 6, 1984) is a regular-footed professional skateboarder, living and working in New York City.

Early life
Born in Hyannis, Massachusetts, Bassett grew up in Chatham, Massachusetts.

Skateboarding career
Zered Bassett's first sponsor was Sixteen Skateboards.

In 2003, Bassett appeared in the Zoo York Skateboard Company video City of Killers. In 2005, Bassett appeared in the DVS Shoes video "Skate More" and his co-directed film "Vicious Cycle" with RB Umali. Also in 2005, Bassett had the closing part of the Digital Skateboarding video titled Divercity, skating to the Timbaland & Jay-Z song, Lobster & Shrimp.

In 2005, Bassett won Rookie of the year at The 7th Annual TransWorld SKATEboarding Awards.

In 2007, Bassett starred in the RB Umali produced show: Firsthand On Fuel TV.

In 2008, Bassett received his first pro shoe from DVS Shoes.

In 2009, Bassett appeared in the Zoo York State of Mind video with a 6+ minute part, skating to two songs: Dio by Holy Diver and M.O.P. - Cold As Ice.

In 2012, Bassett left Zoo York as corporate restructuring led the company to cut all riders not currently on long term contracts. Only Brandon Westgate and Chaz Ortiz remained. Westgate would leave the company in 2015 and Ortiz in 2018. In October 2012, Bassett signed with Expedition skateboards.

In 2014, Bassett had a part in the Transworld Outliers video. Also in 2014, Bassett had a part in the Supreme video - cherry - directed by Bill Strobeck.

In 2016, Bassett left Expedition.

In 2017, Bassett signed with Alltimers skateboards.

In 2018, Bassett had a part in both the Alltimers video No Idea and the Converse video Purple.

As of 2023, Basset continues to put out video parts, including Alltimers' 2021 ET&DUSTIN and You Deserve It in 2022. He has also been featured in Dave Caddo's 2022 video Pattern Language and CONS/Krooked's Middle Earth, both of which were released in 2022.

Sponsors
Converse, Alltimers, Tensor Trucks, Mob Grip, Hardluck, Spitfire

References

External links
Zered Bassett ‘Outliers’ Interview - Transworld Skateboarding Magazine

1984 births
Living people
American skateboarders
Sportspeople from New York City
People from Chatham, Massachusetts
People from Hyannis, Massachusetts
Sportspeople from Barnstable County, Massachusetts